The China University of Petroleum is a state Double First Class University in China. It consists of China University of Petroleum (Beijing), and China University of Petroleum (Huadong). Both are regarded as the best universities in China according to the QS World University Rankings by Subjects in "Petroleum Engineering" subjects. It is placed under the administration of the Ministry of Education. Both of China University of Petroleum - Beijing (CUP) and China University of Petroleum -  Huadong (UPC) are Chinese state Double First Class Universities included in the Double First Class University Plan, approved by the central government of China.

There are two individual entities for China University of Petroleum, UPC and CUP. China University of Petroleum (Beijing) (CUP) is located in Beijing, and China University of Petroleum (Huadong) (UPC) is located in Qingdao and Dongying, Shandong Province.

History
The university, founded in 1953, was known then as Beijing Petroleum Institute. It was founded acquiring the best petroleum associated departments in the country:
 Petroleum research groups in Department of Geology, Department of Mining and Department of Chemical Engineering from Tsinghua University
 Petroleum research groups in four departments of Peiyang University (now Tianjin University)
 Part of Department of Chemical Engineering from Peking University
 Part of Department of Mathematics from Yanching University (now merged into Peking University)
 Some students and faculty from fluid fuel research group in Department of Chemical Engineering from Dalian Institute of Technology (now Dalian University of Technology)
 Some students and faculty in Department of Mining and Department of Chemical Engineering from Northwestern Polytechnical Institute (now the Northwestern Polytechnical University)

It moved to Dongying, Shandong Province in 1969, with name changed to Huadong Petroleum Institute. In 1988, it was renamed The University of Petroleum consisting of one part in Dongying as the college and one in Beijing as the graduate school. Each gradually developed into universities with both undergraduate and graduate students. In January 2005, its name changed to China University of Petroleum. In 2004, China University of Petroleum (Huadong) began to move to Qingdao, and completed the relocation in 2012. The Dongying campus currently serves as the base for continuing education, remote education, research laboratories, and industry collaboration.

China University of Petroleum specializes in upstream, midstream and downstream petroleum science and engineering, in the overall level of domestic lead. Its five national key disciplines (second-level) are:
 Chemical Engineering and Technology
 Mineral Resources Prospecting and Exploration
 Oil and Gas Well Engineering
 Oil and Gas Storage and Transportation Engineering
 Oil and Gas Field Development Engineering

CUP Campuses
China University of Petroleum-Beijing has two campuses, one in Changping District, Beijing and the other in Karamay, Xinjiang. It also has its own graduate school under the administration of Ministry of Education.  In 1997, it became of member of the first “Project 211” universities and in 2006 it was nominated as one of the universities to construct National Innovation Platform for Advantageous Disciplines. Now, both of the two entities are included in the Chinese state Double First Class University Plan.

Beijing Campus

Beijing campus is situated in Changping District, Beijing, covers an area of 0.331 km2. Until January 2017, there are 1436 teachers, in which 237 professors including two academicians of Chinese Academy of Science (Wang Tieguan and Gao Deli) and two academicians of Chinese Academy of Engineering (Shen Zhonghou and Li Gensheng), and 350 associate professors, in Beijing campus.  There are 9 professors received the title of Changjiang Distinguished Professor for Changjiang Scholars Program.

Beijing campus currently has 7,714 undergraduate students, 5,538 Master students, 1,142 PhDs and approximately 800 overseas students from 52 countries.

The Secretary of the Party Committee of China University of Petroleum – Beijing is Shan Honghong (since January 2017) who is the former president of China University of Petroleum (East China). The President of Beijing Campus is Zhang Laibin (since June 2005).

Karamay Campus

Karamay campus opened in October 2015, with the  support from Beijing campus, Ministry of Education, Government on both provincial and municipal levels, as well as the China National Petroleum Corporation.

Karamay campus is located in Karamay, Xinjiang and covers an area of 4.8 km2. The Principal of Karamay campus is Zhang Shicheng (since March 2016) who is the Vice President in Beijing campus as well (since September 2008).

Karamay campus is geographically close to several countries in China's Belt and Road Initiative, namely, Kazakhstan, Uzbekistan, Turkmenistan, Kyrgyzstan, Tajikistan, Afghanistan, Pakistan, and Mongolia. It teaches engineering, economics, finance, business, management, computer science, information technology, TCFL (Teaching Chinese as a Foreign Language).

At present, the teachers are constituted by two parts: about one half are assigned by Beijing campus, who are either professors or associate professors, and the other half are employed by Karamay campus, of whom two thirds are PhDs. The scope of teaching and research covers areas like Geological Engineering, Petroleum Engineering, Geophysical Prospecting, Well Testing, Chemical Engineering, Mechanics, Storage and Transport, and Electric Engineering, Mathematics, Physics, Chemistry, Materials, Computer, Ideological Politics, Humanities, Foreign Languages, and P.E.

In the fall semester of 2016, it enrolled the first batch of 461 undergraduate students from 16 nationwide.

Qingdao and Dongying
China University of Petroleum – Huadong is located in Qingdao. It also manages its old campus in Dongying.

Rankings and reputation 
China University of Petroleum is often ranked No. 1 among Chinese universities in the field of petroleum related subjects and 41st globally according to the latest QS World University Rankings by Subjects in "Petroleum Engineering" subjects.

Global University Rankings of CUP:
 Academic Ranking of World Universities: 701–800th globally
 Times Higher Education World University Rankings: 601–800th globally
 THE World University Impacts Rankings in "Industry, Innovation, and Infrastructure":  57th globally
 US News Best Global Universities Ranking: 605th globally

Notable alumni
The alumni of CUP include the top officials of China, CEOs of major oil companies, members of Chinese Academy of Sciences, and members of Chinese Academy of Engineering, etc. The most famous alumni are,
Wu Yi – former Vice Premier of the People's Republic of China, Politburo member
Zhou Yongkang – former Politburo Standing Committee member, Secretary of the Central Politics and Law Commission

References

External links
 China University of Petroleum
  China University of Petroleum 
 China University of Petroleum, Beijing
  China University of Petroleum, Beijing 
 China University of Petroleum (Archive)
 China University of Petroleum, Beijing (Archive)
 中国石油大学（北京）克拉玛依校区学校简

 
Universities and colleges in Beijing
Universities and colleges in Qingdao
Educational institutions established in 1953
1953 establishments in China
Petroleum engineering schools
Plan 111